Thierry Renault (born 5 March 1959) is a French lightweight rower. He won a gold medal at the 1985 World Rowing Championships in Hazewinkel with the lightweight men's double scull.

References

1959 births
Living people
French male rowers
World Rowing Championships medalists for France